Nilüfer Çinar Çorlulu (born Nilüfer Çınar in 1962) is a Turkish Woman International Master (WIM) of chess. With nine national champion titles, she is one of the most successful female chess players in Turkey, being only second after Gülümser Öney, who has eleven titles, and equaled in 2013 by Betül Cemre Yıldız.

Early years
Nilüfer was born in 1962 in Iskenderun, southern Turkey. In high school, she was a successful basketball player, and her teacher recommended that she attend sports academy after graduation. She got acquainted with chess quite late through a friend during her first year at the Black Sea Technical University in Trabzon, where she studied mathematics. She soon realized that her friend did not even know the rules of chess well. The more she learned chess, the more her lifestyle changed.

Chess career
In 1984, she participated in a tournament organized by the Student Affairs Directoriate held in İnciraltı, Izmir and took third place. The same year, Nilüfer took part at the Turkish Chess Championship and placed sixth. Getting more ambitious, she thought even about dropping out of university in order to devote herself to chess playing completely. In 1986, she won second place at the national championship. Nilüfer took part at the 27th Chess Olympiad in Dubai, United Arab Emirates in 1986, reaching in total 9½/14. In 1987 she became the Turkish champion, and repeated her success for six consecutive years until 1992. After her second place at the zonal tournament in Greece in 1993, she was awarded the title of Woman International Master by FIDE, as the first ever Turkish woman receiving this honor.

She has complained about the lack of an expert trainer in that time due to the Turkish Chess Federation's financial incapability to support her. She decided then to pause a while because there was no higher goal for her. Still in the national team, she returned to chess in 1999, and became again national champion, defending her title in two following years. She has admitted that in the 1980s and 1990s women's chess in Turkey was not at a high level.

Nilüfer was a member of the Turkish national team for 21 years. A graduate of mathematics, she serves as a trainer and consultant of chess, mathematics and geometry as well as mental arithmetic for children aged 5–14 in her own firm based in Ankara. Nilüfer Çınar Çorlulu plays also simultaneous chess with school children to get them interested in chess. She serves as the Turkish Chess Federation's province representative in Ankara.

Achievements
 Turkish Chess Championship
1986 - 2nd place
1987-1992 (six times), 1999-2001 (three times) - champion

References

External links
 
 
 

1962 births
Living people
People from İskenderun
Karadeniz Technical University alumni
Turkish mathematicians
Turkish sportswomen
Turkish female chess players
Chess Olympiad competitors
Chess officials
Chess in Turkey
Chess Woman International Masters
Sportspeople from Hatay